Potgietersrus Commando was a light infantry regiment of the South African Army. It formed part of the South African Army Infantry Formation as well as the South African Territorial Reserve.

History

Origin
This unit has its origins with Geysers commando around 1914, although residents of the area have been members of other commandos since 1854, such as the Zoutpansberg Commando.

Operations

with the UDF
This commando was active during the 1914 Rebellion and was known as the Potgietersus Commando as early as 1925.

With the SADF
During this era, the unit was mainly engaged in area force protection, search and cordons as well as stock theft control assistance to the rural police.

This unit resorted under the command of the SADF's Group 14.

With the SANDF

Amalgamation
This unit eventually amalgamated with the Springbokvlaktes Commando but retained its name around 1997.

Disbandment
This combined unit, along with all other Commando units was disbanded after a decision by South African President Thabo Mbeki to disband all Commando Units. The Commando system was phased out between 2003 and 2008 "because of the role it played in the apartheid era", according to the Minister of Safety and Security Charles Nqakula.

Unit Insignia

Leadership

References

See also 
 South African Commando System

Infantry regiments of South Africa
South African Commando Units